Chandrajith Ashuboda "Ashu" Marasinghe (born 25 May 1971) is a Sri Lankan politician, professor and academic. He served as an advisor to Sri Lankan president Ranil Wickremesinghe and also served as a former member of parliament of Sri Lanka. He was a national list member of the Parliament of Sri Lanka proposed by United National Front following the 2015 Sri Lankan parliamentary election and subsequently served in the 15th Parliament of Sri Lanka as an MP.

Marasinghe was educated at Nalanda Central College and Ananda College, before attending the University of Colombo, where he earned a B.Sc. in physics and mathematics in 1997. He later studied computer science and engineering at the University of Aizu, Japan, where he received his M.Sc. (2001) and PhD. (2004). He has taught at the International University of Japan and was formerly an associate professor at Nagaoka University of Technology.

In December 2022, he resigned from his position as Presidential Advisor on Parliamentary Affairs and re-appointed in the same post in February 2023.

Political Life

Marasinghe is a Sri Lankan politician and former Member of Parliament. He has served in various capacities, including as the Former Assistant Chief Opposition Whip of the Parliament, Former Monitoring MP of Ministry of Education, Higher Education and Science and Technology, Former Assistant Chief Government Whip of the Parliament, Former Chairman-Sectoral Oversight Committee on Education and Human Resources Development, Former Chairman – Sectoral Oversight Sub Committee on Power & Renewable Energy, and Former Chairman – Sectoral Oversight Sub Committee on Traffic Management. He was also the Former Chairman of the Public Finance Sub Committee on Re-structuring of Sri Lankan Airline. In addition, he has held several key positions in parliamentary friendship associations, including serving as the Former President of the Sri Lanka Ukraine Parliamentary Friendship Association, Former Secretary of the Sri Lanka Japan Parliamentary Friendship Association, Former Secretary of the Sri Lanka Swiss Parliamentary Friendship Association, and Former Secretary of the Sri Lanka Qatar Parliamentary Friendship Association. He has also served as the Former Vice President of the Sri Lanka Australia Parliamentary Friendship Association.

Research Interest

Prof. Ashu Marasinghe has a diverse range of research interests, spanning various fields such as Artificial Intelligence, Cinematic Engineering, Computer Graphics and Multimedia, Virtual Reality and Augmented Reality, Public Health Informatics, Smart-Governance, Social Informatics, and Kansei Engineering. His expertise in these areas allows him to explore the intersection between technology and society, with a focus on improving human experiences and solving real-world problems. He has conducted extensive research in the development of intelligent systems that use data analysis and machine learning to enhance decision-making processes, as well as in the design of immersive digital environments that engage users in new and exciting ways. Additionally, his work in public health informatics and smart governance has contributed to the development of innovative solutions that leverage technology to improve public health outcomes and promote citizen participation in government decision-making.

ACADEMIC PUBLICATIONS (Published more than 100 publications in)

Marasinghe has an extensive research publication record covering a broad range of topics, including Artificial Intelligence, Artificial Life, Cinematic Engineering, Computer Graphics and Multimedia, Virtual Reality and Augmented Reality, Emotional Intelligence, Software Engineering, Public Health Informatics, Neuroscience, Neural Network, Fuzzy System, Intelligent Control System, Multi Agent System, Ubiquitous System, U/E/Smart-Governance, Social Informatics, Computational Ecology, Knowledge Technology, Cybernetics, and Kansei/Affective Engineering. His publications reflect his diverse research interests and interdisciplinary approach to solving complex problems through the application of cutting-edge technology. His contributions in the field of artificial intelligence, in particular, have advanced the development of intelligent systems capable of learning and decision-making. His work in the area of public health informatics has also been instrumental in developing digital solutions to promote better health outcomes. Furthermore, his research in neuroscience, multi-agent systems, and intelligent control systems has the potential to enhance human-robot interaction, while his work in social informatics and smart governance has explored the use of technology to improve citizen participation in government decision-making.

Parliamentary Activities
(1st of September 2015 to 2 March 2020)

 Appointed as a United National Party National List MP for the 8th Parliament of Sri Lanka since September 01st 2015
 Served as an Assistant Chief Government Whip of the Parliament  
 Served as an Assistant Chief Opposition Whip of the Parliament
 Attendance 99% , 408 days out of 414 days from 01st of September 2015 to 21st February 2020. 
 Rank no. 1 out of 225 MP`s according to manthri.lk rankings (http://www.manthri.lk/ ).
 Overall parliamentary activity rank is 22 out of 225 MP`s according to manthri.lk rankings 
 Appointed as a first Sectoral Oversight Committee Chairman of 8th Parliament of Sri Lanka (Sectoral Oversight Committee on Education and Human Resources Development). Introduced the new system of Sectoral Oversight Committees to the Sri Lankan Parliament  and  resolution approved by the House on 19 December 2015
 President – Sri Lanka Ukraine Parliamentary Friendship Association 
 Secretary – Sri Lanka Japan Parliamentary Friendship Association
 Secretary – Sri Lanka Swiss Parliamentary Friendship Association
 Secretary – Sri Lanka Qatar Parliamentary Friendship Association
 Vice President – Sri Lanka Australia Parliamentary Friendship Association
 South Asia Parliamentarian Platform for Children

Committees Involved/ Served
(1st of September 2015 to 2 March 2020)

 Chairman - Sectoral Oversight Committee on Education and Human Resources Development, from 09.03.2016 to 07.06.2016 and from 27.05.2019 to 02.03.2020
 Chairman - Sub-Committee on Education under the Sectoral Oversight Committee on Education and Human Resources Development, from 06.09.2016 to 27.05.2019
 Chairman - Sub Committee on Power and Renewable Energy under the Sectoral Oversight Committee on Energy, from 20.07.2016 to 02.03.2020
 Chairman - Sub Committee on Traffic Management under the Sectoral Oversight Committee on National Security, from 10.08.2016 to 02.03.2020
 Chairman – Public Finance Sub Committee on Re-structuring of Sri Lankan Airline, from 06.07.2018 to 23.07.2019
 Chairman – Public Finance Sub Committee on Revenue Collection, from 12.07.2017 to 20.08.2019
 Member - Parliamentary Caucus for Children
 Member - Sectoral Oversight Committee on Energy
 Member - Sectoral Oversight Committee on National Security
 Member - Sub Committee on Prison Reforms under the Sectoral Oversight Committee on National Security
 Member - Sub Committee appointed to look into the issue of the Principal of Tamil Balika Maha Vidyalaya in Baddulla, under the Sectoral Oversight Committee on Education and Human Resources Development
 Member - Liaison Committee
 Member - Committee on Public Finance
 Member - Committee on Public Accounts 
 Member - Sectoral Oversight Committee on Manufacturing and Services 
 Member - Ministerial Consultative Committee on Public Enterprise, Kandyan Heritage and Kandy Development 
 Member - Ministerial Consultative Committee on Development Strategies and International Trade 
 Member - Select Committee of Parliament to look into and report to Parliament on the terrorist attacks that took place in Sri Lanka on 21 April 2019

Reports presented to the Parliament as a Chairman of the Sectoral Oversight Committee on Education and Human Resources Development

 Report of the Sectoral Oversight Committee on Education and Human Resources Development on 'National Minimum Wage of Workers' Bill and 'Budgetary Relief Allowance of Workers' Bill on Thursday, 10 March 2016 
 Report of the Sub-Committee on Higher Education of the Sectoral Oversight Committee on Education and Human Resources Development on "Expansion of Medical Education in Sri Lanka With the Participation of the Private Sector: Adopting the South Asian Institute of Technology and Medicine (SAITM) as a Model" on 23 November 2016
 Report of the Sectoral Oversight Committee on Education and Human Resources Development on Observations on the Batticaloa Campus (Pvt.) Ltd on Friday, 21 June 2019
 Report of the Sectoral Oversight Committee on Education and Human Resources Development on the circular issued by the Ministry of Education for the admission of Grade 1 students on Thursday, 27 June 2019
 Report of the Sectoral Oversight Committee on Education and Human Resources Development on Settlement of Issues of the Service in the Post of Project Assistants (non-formal education) Connected to the Non-formal Education Sector, on Friday, 9 August 2019
 Report of the Sectoral Oversight Committee on Education and Human Resources Development on the National Teacher Transfer Policy Circular issued by the Ministry of Education, on Thursday, 23 January 2020
 Report of the Sectoral Oversight Committee on Education and Human Resources Development on the “Sri Lanka In-Service Advisors Service” on Friday, 7 February 2020
 Report of the Sectoral Oversight Committee on Education and Human Resources Development on the 2020-2030 National Policy and Strategic Plan, on STEM Education on Friday, 03rd January 2020
 Report of the Sectoral Oversight Committee on Education and Human Resources Development on the Introduction of Industrial Sector Oriented Computer Technology Degree Programs into Sri Lankan State Universities and Non State Higher Education Institutes on Wednesday, 19th of February 2020 
 Report of the Sectoral Oversight Committee on Education and Human Resources Development on the Service Issues of Sri Lanka Teachers” Service Officers who have been appointed to the Sri Lanka Principals’ Service as Supernumerary Basis on Thursday, 20th of February 2020 
 Report of the Sectoral Oversight Committee on Education and Human Resources Development on the “Service Issues of the officers who were appointed to the Sri Lanka Education Administrative Service 1985-1994” on Thursday, 20th of February 2020 
 Report of the Sectoral Oversight Committee on Education and Human Resources Development on the Formulation of the Advisory Committee and Policy Framework to Introduce Supplementary Reading Materials on Sexual and Reproductive Health Education on Thursday, 20th of February 2020

Matters Discussed as the Chair of the Sub-Committee on Higher Education Under the Sectoral Oversight Committee on Education and Human Resources Development
(06.09.2016 - 27.05.2019)

Consideration of Issues relating to the Faculty of Medicine of the General Sir John Kotalawala Defence University Release of 16 Consultants from the Ministry of Health, Nutrition and Indigenous Medicine, Facilitate the process of releasing Medical Consultants, Nurses, MLTs and other Technicians to the University Hospital, Treasury Approval for the University Hospital Cadre
Consideration of Issues relating to Faculties of Medicine of State Universities
The issues relating to the University of Visual and Performing Arts. Future Plans of the University, Cadre Position of the Staff of the Faculties of the; Visual Arts, Music, Dance and Drama, and Graduate Studies 
Issues relating to the South Asian Institute of Technology and Medicine. (SAITM)
Reviewing the progress of the activities in relation to handing over the NFTH to the Government
Discussion on the Matters Relating to the BCAS City Campus, 
Discussion on the Matters Relating to ESOFT Metro Campus, 
Discussion on the Matters Relating to KAATSU International Institute (KIU)
Discussion on the Matters Relating to the SLIIT 
Discussion on the Matters Relating to the Standing Committee on Accreditation and Quality Assurance (SCAQA)
Providing awareness to A/L students on interest free loan scheme to follow a degree at non-state Higher Education Institutes and possibility of obtaining the relevant data about A/L students directly from University Grants Commission to utilize in this process.
Maintaining the standards of Non-State Higher Education
Discussion on “Upgrading of the Sri Lankan Aviation College to the University Level”
Progress of the preparation of the foundation course for students, who are not qualified in Advanced Level and wish to follow BIT in Non-State Higher Education Institutes.
Process of Granting Degree Awarding Status to the Sri Lankan Aviation College
Establishment of Asian Institute for Science and Technology (AIST)
Matters relating to the Coordinating Secretariat for Science, Technology and Innovation (COSTI)
Progress of Institutional and Program Evaluations done by SCAQA.
Consideration of the Report on the Number of Students, selected for State Universities from each school in Colombo District, for last five years
Matters relating to the Regional Centers of the Non-State Universities.
Creating an Industry Oriented Technological Computer Degree Program.
Matters relating to “Conducting Lectures for BEd. Degree Program in Regional Centers of the Non-State Higher Educational Institutions”
Discussion on the matters relating to the Batticaloa Campus (Pvt) Ltd.

Matters Discussed  as the Chair  of the Sub-Committee on Power & Renewable Energy  Under the Sectoral Oversight Committee on Energy
(20.07.2016 - 02.03.2020)

 Matters relating to “Coal Tender”
 Preparation of “National Electricity Policy Plan of Sri Lanka” 
 Issues with regard to Norochcholei Plant
 Completion & approval of ‘Grid Code’
 The ‘Kerawalapitiya Power Purchase Agreement – (West Coast Company Agreement)’
 The current situation and future prospects of generation of wind power 
 Discussion on the Long Term Generation Plan 2018-2037
 Amendments to be made to the Electricity Act
 Acceleration of the implementation process of the approved Long Term Generation Expansion Plan (2018-2037)
 Implementation of 100 Mw solar power and 170 Mw wind power projects at ‘Poonaryne’ / Pooneryne Energy Park”
 Discussion on the matters relating to the 100 MW Barge power plant at Galle
 Discussion on the matters relating to the LNG Plants at Kerawalapitiya
 The Approved Long Term Generation Expansion Plan 2018-2037’
 Discussion on the matters relating to the Long Term Generation Expansion Plan 2020-2039’
 The proposed new tariff policy on ‘Roof top Solar’
 Sri Lanka Electricity (Amendment) Bill
 Household Rooftop Solar power generation 
 Proposed Policy Guidelines and Methodology for Development of Non- Conventional Renewable Energy NCRE Projects

Matters Discussed  as the Chair  of the Sub- Committee on Traffic Management Under the Sectoral Oversight Committee on National Security 
(10.08.2016 - 02.03.2020)

 Matters relating to increasing Traffic Congestion due to container lorries entering Colombo city
 Matters relating to Driving License
 Educating School Children on Road safety
 Reducing Traffic Congestion
 Discussion on Reducing Traffic Accidents
 Discussion on Developing Rail Transport
 Discussion on matters relating to the Department of Railways
 Discussion on the Project of Advanced Traffic Management System (ATMS) KOICA/RDA
 Measures to be taken to reduce traffic accidents’
 Tender Process and Implementation of the Vehicle Emission Testing Program
 Discussion on Matters relating Number plates of vehicles
 Discussion on Matters relating Installing CCTV Cameras to improve Road Safety 
 Discussion on Matters relating to Construction of Pedestrian Bridges instead of Pelican Crossings
 Consideration on relocating the Container yard at "Dematagoda" to "Mattakkuliya" to reduce the traffic congestion

Foreign official visits as a Member of Parliament

 International Parliamentary Conference on Sustainability, Energy and Development	14 to 17 March 2016	London, United Kingdom
 Visit of Hon. Ranil Wickremesinghe, Prime Minister of Sri Lanka and delegation to Japan	10 to 16 April 2017 	Tokyo, Japan
 Visit to Laos People’s Democratic Republic by Members of Sri Lanka-Laos Parliamentary Friendship Association 	12 to 15 June 2017, Vientiane, Laos
 Visit of Hon. Karu Jayasuriya, MP, Speaker and Parliamentary delegation to Japan 	25 February to 3 March 2018	Tokyo, Japan
 As a member of the delegation at the invitation of the Japanese Prime Minister Shinzo Abe, President Maithripala Sirisena will undertake a State visit to Japan 	12 to 17 March 2018	Tokyo, Japan
 2018 Meeting of the South Asia Parliamentarian Platform for Children 	1 to 4 May 2018	Dhaka, Bangladesh
 RSIS-WTO Parliamentarian Workshop on International trade 	7 9 May 2018	Singapore
 Visit of Sri Lankan Parliamentary delegation to Tibet 	24 June to 1 July 2018	Tibet
 Visit to Switzerland by Office bearers & Ex – Co Members of Sri Lanka – Switzerland Parliamentary Friendship Association	13 to 21 October 2018, Switzerland
 Study Visit organized by WFD to share United Kingdom experience and expertise on Oversight Committees	01 to 5 July 2019	United Kingdom

Research
	D-Maru Go Professor/ Associate Professor, Nagaoka University of Technology
Kamitomioka, Nagaoka, Niigata, Japan. Head of Kansei Informatics Lab. Administrate and guide student research activities in Artificial Intelligent, Artificial Life, Cinematic Engineering, Computer Graphics and Multimedia, Virtual Reality and Augmented Reality, Public Health Informatics, Neuroscience, Neural Network, Fuzzy System, Intelligent Control System, Multi Agent System, Ubiquitous System, U-Governance, Social Informatics, and Kansei Engineering

	JSPS Research Associate, Software Engineering Laboratory
The University of Aizu, Aizu-Wakamatsu, Fukushima Japan; October 2004- September 2006.
Various research tasks including research in Software Engineering, Kansei Engineering, Computational Ecology, and related fields. Administrate and guide student research activities in Software Engineering, Knowledge Technology, Cybernetics, and Kansei/Affective Technology in the lab with Prof. M. Osano.

	Selected as a model researcher & featured in Winter 2005 No. 14 issue of JSPS Quarterly 
The Japan society for the promotion of Science (JSPS) provides fellowships to researchers of other countries who have recently earned their doctoral degrees. Each year, around 1,600 overseas researchers in fields of the natural sciences, humanities and social sciences are invited through a competitive selection process to come to Japan (quoted from the application guide for JSPS Fellowship Program). Of the 1,600 JSPS fellows 4 researchers are selected and featured in JSPS quarterly as a model researcher.

	Research Assistant, The Graduate Department of Information Systems
The University of Aizu,  Fukushima Japan; October 2001 – September 2004
Responsible for various research tasks including research in Kansei Engineering, computational linguistics, acoustic phonetics and second-language speech acquisition

Teaching
 Visiting Professor - International University of Japan, Niigata Japan (2007 April – 2015 August)
MBA and EBiz Course
Networking and Secure Data Transmission 
 D-Maru Go Professor/ Associate Professor – Department of Management and Information Systems Engineering, *Nagaoka University of Technology, Niigata, Japan (2006 October - 2015 August) 
Undergraduate Level
Database Management Systems
Software Engineering
Information Network
Statistical Engineering
Object Oriented Programming
Graduate School Master Level
Advanced Database Systems
Advanced Software System Engineering
Advanced Information Network
Kansei Engineering
Advanced Internet Technology and Governance
Doctoral Level 
Advanced Computer Science  
JSPS Research Associate, Software Engineering Laboratory, The University of Aizu, Aizu-Wakamatsu, Fukushima Japan (October 2004 – September 2006)　
Administrate and guide/teach student research activities in various software engineering projects in the lab.
Some of these research projects include:
Generating Forest Environment Target from Agriculture based on Native Water Cycle with System Dynamics.
3D Visualization of Climber Growth Process.
Modeling Dimensions of Emotion in an Interactive e-Learning System.
Kansei Brain for Intelligent Communication in a Robotics System.
Computational Forest Ecosystem Based on Cellular Automata and Multi-Agent System.
Resource Recycling Meme Model for Balancing of Diverse Culture.
Research Assistant, The Graduate Department of Information Systems, The University of Aizu, Fukushima Japan (October 2001 – September 2004)
Served as teaching assistant in Visual Communication, Acoustic Modeling, & Discrete Systems courses.
Instructor, The Center of the International Cooperation for Computerization (CICC), Tokyo, Japan (April 2001 – April 2003)
CICC provides computer technology training programs in Japan for invited trainees from developing countries.
Responsible of teaching & conducting workshops. 
Contributed to the following courses:
Multimedia System Development Course
Web Based Training Course
Multimedia Web Contents Development Course
Instructional Design Course

ADMINISTRATIVE, PROFESSIONAL, & PROJECT ACTIVITIES

Chairman of State Engineering Corporation (SEC) of Sri Lanka (2010 – 2011) 

State Engineering Corporation of Sri Lanka is a State sponsored corporation established in 1962. There are four main groups in SEC those are Consultancy, Construction Components, Construction, and Mechanical & Electrical Engineering. Chairman is a CEO of the SEC and I had undertaken over 100 projects during my period. Chairman is responsible for Planning, investigation, design and construction of industrial projects in the public sector.

Projects which he lead;

Consultancy Projects
 Construction of Library Building for the Gampaha Wickramarachchi Ayurveda Institute 
 Construction of Married Quarters Complex at 'Guwanpura'(Phase II) 
 Construction of 120 Houses at Mayura Place, (Phase I) Colombo 06.
 Construction and Completion of proposed Bus Stand & Commercial Complex Stage I (Option I-RCC Structure, Ground Floor & Roof) at Homagama
 Proposed Development of "Pola" Area at Nugegoda
 Construction of Proposed single storeyed Building for Corporal's club- ranaviru Apparels at Alawwa
 Construction of Safari Road in African Lion Zone at Safari park Ridigama, Hambantota
 Construction of Wall and Chain Link Fence at Safari Park Ridigama, Hambantota
 African Lion Dens Complex in African Lion Zone at Safari park Ridigama, Hambantota 
 African Lion Quarantine Cages in African Lion Zone at Safari park Ridigama, Hambantota
 Visitor Center Office /Car Park at Safari park Ridigama, Hambantota
 Animal hospital for safari park at  Safari park Ridigama, Hambantota 
 Proposed Mihindupura housing at Baseline road, Colombo 6 – Design development
 Simulator Training Building Project at BIA, Katunayake
 Girls' and Boys' Hostel and 400 mtr. Track Play Ground- Tholangamuwa Maha Vidyalaya
 400 mtr. Track - Kegalle Maha Vidyalaya 
 Data, Voice Backbone, Structured cabling & UPS System
 Air conditioning System for Proposed Head Office Building for Sri Lanka Customs
 Escalator & Passenger Elevators for Head Quarters Building for Sri Lanka Customs
 Fire & Life safety System for Sri Lanka Customs
 Building Management System for Head Quarters Building for Sri Lanka Custom
 Telecommunication System for Head Office Building for Sri Lanka Customs
 Proposed Head office building for Sri Lanka Customs 
 Refurbishment of Department of Inland Revenue Building 
 Refurbishment of the Training Centre at Nawam Mawatha
 Proposed Building for Foreign Employment Building at Tangalle              
 Construction of Proposed Residential Training Centre for Migrant workers’ class room block at Mathugama
 Face Lifting of People's Bank Head Office Building
 Construction of Proposed Residential Training Centre for Migrant workers-work shop building at Mathugama
 Proposed stores & office Building (Penicillin Zone) for SPMC at Rathmalana Phase II
 Additions & Alterations for MOH Clinic building at Wake Kirindiwela, in Dompe Electorate, Gampaha District 
 Proposed Pradeshiya saba Building at Samanthurai
 Construction & Completion of Proposed Building (Stage II) For Lecture Halls, Research Laboratories, Seminar & Conference Room, Dean’s Office, And Lecturers Rooms Faculty of Applied Sciences at Mihintale
 Proposed boys' hostel for 400 students at Mihintale
 Construction and completion of clinical building complex of faculty of Medicine & Allied Science of Rajarata University at Anuradhapura.
 Construction and Completion of Proposed Building Stage I for Faculty of Commerce & Management
 Faculty of Dancing for University of Visual and Performing Arts Stage II
 Administration building for University of Visual & Performance Arts
 Proposed pre-Clinical Building Complex at Maradana Rd, University of Colombo - stage II (16 storied building upper and basement parking)
 Building complex Faculty of Fisheries, Marine Science & Technology 
 Computer Science and Computer Unit Building-Stage II
 Faculty of Management & Finance
 Applied Science Stage II Phase II
 Applied Science Stage III
 Faculty of Business Studies and Finance - Stage I
 Proposed Building Stage II/Phase II, Faculty of Livestock, Fisheries & Nutrition, Makandura
 Faculty of Agriculture Stage I
 Proposed Administration Building for Buddhashravaka Bhikshu University
 Proposed buildings for Faculty of Buddhist Studies at Buddhashravaka Bhikshu University
 Proposed Media Centre for Government Information Department
 Islamic Cultural Centre at T. B. Jayah Mawatha 
 Proposed head office building for the Western Province Provincial Road Passenger Transport Authority.
 Bus Stand at Delgoda
 Construction of the 2 storied building in the premises of Ministry of Transport, Colombo
 Air Condition & Refrigeration Building Ceylon German Technical Training Institute at Moratuwa.
 Refurbishment of Sugathadasa Indoor Stadium – maintenance period
 Proposed Artificial Hockey Turf and Pavilion for the Sports Complex at Reid Avenue, Colombo – 07.
 New Bus Stand Anuradhapura- Wing "A” Proposed Four Storied Building (Block C) for District Secretariat at Matara Fort

Construction Component Projects 
 Proposed Alternations & additions for existing MOH building at Walgama 
 Design and Construction of Parapet Wall along the Boundary of Ceylon Fertilizer Company at Hunupitiya  
 Construction of MOH building at Dalupitiya and improvements and additions to MOH buildings at Mawaramandiya and Kirindiwela 
 Proposed 48 watte five storied low income housing scheme stage II 
 Proposed three storied class room block for Tissa Vidyalaya at Kaluthara. 
 Construction of proposed community center for Sri-Wickramapura housing scheme 
 Construction of three storied OR's Billet building for Ranaviru Apparels at Alawwa 
 Construction of culverts on Somawathiya-Seruwavila

Mechanical & Electrical Engineering 
 Refurbishment works of Sahaspura housing complex 
 Construction of Septic Tanks, Toilets and Bath at 118 Garden, Paradise Road Repairs to fixed Roof of Tank 34 
 Repairs for collapsed sewer line at Galle Rd-Wellawatta 
 Refurbishment of Damaged Canopies in Sahaspura
 Construction of Bridge across Dehiwala Canal 
 Face Lifting of People’s Bank Head Office Building 
 Nayapamulla-Unanwita-Batuwangala Bridge 
 Repair Work of Antenna Tower at Palaly 
 Improvement of Storm water drainage system at People’s Park 
 Kittangi Bridge on Kalmunai 
 Rehabilitation of Electrical Wiring System at BOI Building 
 Re-construction of Box Bridge No. 159/3 on Colombo – Galle – Wellawaya Road 
 Construction of Bridge across Mahaweli River at Kandakadu

Construction Group 
 Proposed Construction of Third Medical ward complex for National Hospital at Colombo. 
 Improvement of Puttlam Marichchikade Road (0.00 to 1.5Km), Puttlam 
 Construction of Sirimavo Bandaranayake Specialized Children's Hospital, Stage II, Peradeniya 
 Proposed Multi-Storeyed Married Quarters Complex (Phase ii) Sri Lanka Air Force "Guwanpura", Boralla
 Proposed Construction of Courts complex at Negambo 
 Construction of Water Tank & Under Ground Sump for Dep. of National Zoological Gardens at Pinnawala 
 Construction of Internal Access Rd & Peripheral Service at National Zoological Garden, Pinnawala
 Construction of Proposed Artificial Hockey Turf Ground at Read Avenue, Colombo 07 
 Proposed Development of Sports Complex (Hostel Building), Torrington Place-Colombo-07 
 Construction of wall and chain link fence at Safari Zoo, Ridiyagama, Hambanthota. 
 Construction of Safari Road in African Lion Zone at Safari Zoo, Ridiyagama, Hambanthota. 
 Construction of African lion Quarantine in African Lion Zone at Safari Zoo, Ridiyagama,Hambanthota 
 Construction of African Lion Dens complex in African Lion Zone at Safari Zoo, Ridiyagama, Hambanthota
 Construction of Animal hospital complex at Safari Zoo, Ridiyagama, Hambanthota
 Construction of New Theater & Blood Bank Complex at District Hospital, Minuwangoda 
 Improvements to New Theater & Blood Bank Complex at District Hospital, Minuwangoda 
 Head Office Building for Provincial Road Passenger Transport Authority-Baththaramulla 
 Construction and Completion of Proposed Development of Bus Stand at Delgoda 
 Construction Bus stand and commercial complex, Matugama
 Construction Bus stand and commercial complex, High Level Road, Homagama 
 Renovation & Reconstruction of Rajapihilla Rest House, Rajapihilla Road, Kurunegala 
 Clinical Building Faculty of Medical & Allied Science, Rajarata University- Stage I & II, Teaching Hospital, Anuradhapura 
 Construction of Portable Water Distribution system for Department of National Zoological Gardens at Pinnawala 
 Supply & laying of pipes, construction of washout chambers, pump house & fixing of specials for Zoological Garden at Pinnawala 
 Construction of Storm Water Collection & Disposal System for Department of National Zoological Gardens at Pinnawala 
 Construction of Super Structure for Zoo Service Building at   Zoological Garden at Pinnawala. 
 Electrical Distribution Net Work System for National Zoological Gardens at Pinnawala 
 Proposed Building Complex (Stage I) for Sri Lanka Bureau Employment, Yayawatta, Godigamuwa, Tangalle 
 Supply & Installation of Passenger Lift with Facilities for Disabled Persons at Court Complex, Mount Lavinia. 
 Construction of Library Building for Gampaha Wickramarachchi Ayurweda Institute 
 Proposed 2 No Hostals,400 m athletic Running Track & Pavilion for Tholangamuwa Central College, Tholangamuwa
 Construction of Cricket Ground Pavilion. Three Storeyed class room Block and Improvements to Badminton court for Kegalu Vidyalaya
 Proposed Residential Training Center for Migrant Workers at Matugama for Sri Lanka Bureau of Foreign Employment-Matugama
 Construction of a Building for the Faculty of Buddhist Studies for Buddhashawaka Bhikku University at Anuradhapura
 Construction of Disaster Management & Coordination Centre-Stage II 
 Proposed Four Storied Building (Block C) for District Secretariat at Matara Fort
 Construction Bus stand at Gunasinghepura
 Construction of Animal Nursery at National Zoological Gardens Dehiwala
 Construction of Two Unit of Staff Grade Quarters at National Zoological Gardens Dehiwala
 Construction of Water Sump at National Zoological Gardens Dehiwala
 Construction of Reptilian at National Zoological Gardens Dehiwala
 Construction of Administration Building and Section 1 Remand Building Construction of "Pola-Fruits and Vegetable Market" at Nugegoda

Administrative Committee Member in the Nagaoka University of Technology, Japan 
(October 2006 – 2015 August)

Committees 
 Doctoral Degree Faculty Assembly:  Department in Charge 
 International Affairs Committee
 Academic Curriculum Committee
 University Industry Collaboration Committee

Teaching Assistant, The Graduate Department of Information Systems, The University of Aizu, Fukushima Japan 
(October 1999 – September 2001)
 Responsible for teaching, grading, tutoring in Natural Language Processing, Automata & Languages, Advanced Algorithms & Discrete Systems courses.

International Communication & English Teacher, The Aizu-Wakamatsu Board of Education, Aizu-Wakamatsu, Fukushima, Japan 
(April 2003 – February 2004)
Served as an International Communication & English Teacher in the Higashiyama elementary school in Aizu-Wakamatsu.

Instructor, The Institute of Computer Technology (now University of Colombo School of Computing), University of Colombo, Sri Lanka 
(1997 September – 1999 September)
Served as an Instructor in Graduate Training Program. Responsible of teaching in various Computer Science & Software Engineering courses.
Instructor/Project Member, The Institute of Computer Technology (now University of Colombo School of Computing), University of Colombo, Sri Lanka (1997 September – 1999 September)
Had responsibilities in various research & project tasks in the following:  
Kothmale Community Radio/Internet Project: Expanding the Knowledge Base, The Kothmale Community Radio Internet Project, implemented by UNESCO, was the first pilot experiment in Sri Lanka to develop a suitable access model to address of ICT benefits to rural communities.
Sri Lankan government web site project (www.lk)
Local language standardization project

INTERNATIONAL CONFERENCE ADMINISTRATIVE ACTIVITIES

 Conference Chair 1st International Conference on Energy, Environment and Human Engineering 2013, Yangon, Myanmar December 21 – 23 2013
 Organization Chair 12th International Conference on Humans and Computers HC'2009 Shizuoka, Japan, December 9–11, 2009
 General Chair in the IEEE/3rd International Conference on Kansei Engineering & Affective Systems (KEAS`09), Cieszyn, Poland, June 25 – 28   2009
 General Chair in the IEEE/4th International Conference on Image Analysis and Biometrics (IA&B 2009), Cieszyn, Poland, June 25 – 28   2009
 General Chair in the International Symposium on Country Domain Governance (CDG’08) Nagaoka, Japan November 20–22, 2008
 General Chair in the 11th International Conference on Humans and Computers (HC-2008) Nagaoka, Japan, November 20 – 23 2008
 General Chair in the Second International Conference on Kansei Engineering & Affective Systems (KEAS '08) Nagaoka, Japan, November 22 – 24, 2006
 Session Co-chair in IEEE Joint 4th International Conference on Soft Computing and Intelligent Systems and 9th International Symposium on advanced Intelligent Systems, SCIS & ISIS 2008, September 17–21, 2008 Nagoya, Japan
 General Chair in International Symposium on Asian Language Resource: ALRN Multilingual Corpus, Nagaoka, Japan, March 3–5, 2007  Member of the Program Committee Third International Symposium on Humanized Systems (ISHS'07), Muroran, Hokkaido, Japan.   General Chair in the first International Conference on Kansei Engineering & Intelligent Systems (KEIS '06) Aizu-Wakamatsu, Japan, August 6 – 8, 2006
 Organization Chair and Member of the Program Committee and Organization Chair of the Ninth International Conference on Humans and Computers HC'2006 Aizu, Japan, September 2006
 Session Co-chair (Kansei Engineering) of the Eighth International Conference on Humans and Computers HC'2005 Aizu, Japan, August 31- September 2 
 Member of the Program Committee and Organization Co-chair of the Eighth International Conference on Humans and Computers HC'2005 Aizu, Japan, August 31- September 2.

GRANTS & FELLOWSHIPS 

 Grants-in-Aid for Scientific Research (Kakenhi- 2,800,000 Yen ) for Public Health Informatics from Ministry of Education, Culture, Sports, Science and Technology Japan (MEXT) through Japan Society for the Promotion of Science (JSPS) 2007-2010
 Nagaoka University of Technology - President Research Grant (1,860,000 Yen) 2008-2009
 Grants-in-Aid for Scientific Research (Kakenhi- 1,200,000 Yen ) for Kansei Engineering from Ministry of Education, Culture, Sports, Science and Technology Japan (MEXT) through Japan Society for the Promotion of Science (JSPS). FY 2005.04289 (with Prof. Minetada Osano)
 Grants-in-Aid for Scientific Research (Kakenhi- 600,000 Yen) for Kansei Engineering from Ministry of Education, Culture, Sports, Science and Technology Japan (MEXT) through Japan Society for the Promotion of Science (JSPS). FY 2004.04289 (with Prof. Minetada Osano)
 Japan Society for the Promotion of Science (JSPS) Postdoctoral Fellowship for Foreign Researchers, 2004 October - 2006 October
 Merit research article award ($1000) - Journal of Universal Languages (JUL), 2003 November
 Hewa Nakagima Foundation fellowship, as the best Sri Lankan Doctoral Student in Computer Science & Engineering, 2003 April - 2004 April.
 Rotary Yonayama Foundation fellowship, as the Fukushima-ken’s best Sri Lankan Master’s student in Computer Science & Engineering, 2000 April - 2001 September.
 Distinguished Laksakura award from the Herath Foundation, 1999 October
 The Center of the International Cooperation for Computerization (CICC) fellowship for Multimedia System Development, 1999 May.
 The Association of Overseas Technical Scholarship (AOTS) fellowship for Multimedia System Development, 1999 May.
 The Japanese Government fellowship for the Ship for World Youth 10th program (SWY) Nippon Maru - Bridge for World Friendship, 1998 January. (Travel through Japan, Singapore, Seychelles, Jordan, Oman & Kenya)
 Publications - Refereed Journal Articles
 C Abenayake, M Yoshiki, A Marasinghe, Y Takashi, I Masahiro (2016), Applicability of extra-local methods for assessing community resilience to disasters: A case of Sri Lanka, Journal of Environmental Assessment Policy and Management 18 (02), 1650010
 C P Liyanage, A Marasinghe, K Yamada (2016), Comparison of Optimized Selection Methods of Sampling Sites Network for Water Quality Monitoring in a River, International Journal of Affective Engineering, vol. 15, no. 2, pp. 195–204
 S Lekamge, A Marasinghe, P Kalansooriya, S Nomura (2016), A Visual Interface for Emotion based Music Navigation using Subjective and Objective Measures of Emotion Perception, International Journal of Affective Engineering 15 (2), 205-211
 P Kalansooriya, A Marasinghe, K Bandara (2015), Assessing the Applicability of 3D Holographic Technology as an Enhanced Technology for Distance Learning, The IAFOR Journal of Education, 43-57
 Prabath Weerasinghe, R. P. C. Janaka, Rajapakse, Ashu Marasinghe (2015) An Empirical Analysis on Emotional     Body Gesture for Affective Virtual Communication, International Journal of Affective Engineering, Vol.12, No. 2, pp. 101–107, January 2015
 RAM Madhuwanthi, A Marasinghe, J RPC, AD Dharmawansa (2015), Factors influencing travel behavior on transport mode choice , International Journal of Affective Engineering, IJAE-D-15-00044
 AD Dharmawansa, Y Fukumura, A Marasinghe, RAM Madhuwanthi(2015) Introducing and Evaluating the Behavior of Non-Verbal Features in the Virtual Learning., International Education Studies 8 (6), 82-94
 AD Dharmawansa, Y Fukumura, A Marasinghe, RAM Madhuwanthi(2015) Evaluating the Affection of Eye Blinking in the Virtual Learning Environment, International Journal of Computer Science Issues (IJCSI) 12 (2), 22
 Prabath Weerasinghe, Ashu Marasinghe, Rasika Ranaweera, Senaka Amarakeerthi (2014) Michael Cohen, Emotion Expression for Affective Social Communication, International Journal of Affective Engineering, Vol.13, No. 4, pp. 261–268, December 2014
 AD Dharmawansa, Y Fukumura, A Marasinghe and R.A.M. Madhuwanthi (2014), “Development of a Tracking System Including the Student Status through Their Behavioral Information in the Virtual Class”, International Journal of Science and Advanced Technology, Vol. 4, No. 10 , pp. 6–13
 Rajapakse R. P. C. J., Jayasinghe H., Miyata K., Marasinghe A., Tokuyama Y. (2012) A Study on Gender-Kansei of Three-Dimensional Geometric Shapes,” International Journal of Biometrics (IJBM), Issue 5 (accepted to appear), 2012．
 Fernando S., Yamada K., and Marasinghe A. (2011) New Threshold Updating Mechanism to Stabilize Activity of Hebbian Neuron in a Dynamic Stochastic 'Multiple Synaptic' Network, similar to Homeostatic Synaptic Plasticity Process. International Journal of Computer Applications 36(3):29-37, December 2011.
 Tharangie K. G. D., Irfan C. M. A., Yamada K., Marasinghe A. (2011) Appraisal and guideline to utilise colours in interactive learning environments based on Kansei engineering, International Journal of Biometrics (IJBM), Volume 3 - Issue 4, 285 - 299, 2011, DOI: 10.1504/IJBM.2011.042813
 Tharangie K. G. D., Irfan C. M. A., Yamada K., Marasinghe A. (2010) Kansei Colour Concepts to Improve Effective Colour Selection in Designing Human Computer Interfaces. International Journal of Computer Science Issues Vol. 7, Issue 3, No 4, pp 21-25, May 2010
 Rajapakse R. P. C. J., Miyata K., Marasinghe A., Tokuyama Y. (2010) Real-time rendering of colour-shift effect of metallic materials International Journal of Biometrics (IJBM), Vol. 2 - Issue 2, 185 - 200, 2010, DOI: 10.1504/IJBM.2010.031797
 Marasinghe A: "Public Health Informatics: priorities, challenges, and opportunities" 2009 Journal of Medical Informatics and Technologies . 15-18 (2009)
 Choong C.Y., Mikami Y., Marasinghe C. A., Nandasara S. (2009) T. Optimizing n-gram Order of an n-gram Based Language Identification Algorithm for 68 Written Languages, The International Journal on Advances in ICT for Emerging Regions, vol. 2,, Nov, 2009, pp. 21–28.
 Fernando S., Cho Y.I., Nakamura Y., Matsuzaki S., Marasinghe A.: "Modeling learning on Dynamic behavior of Synapses" 2009 Journal of Medical Informatics and Technologies . 175-180 (2009)
 Tharangie K G D, Irfan C.M.A., Cho Y.M., Nomura S., Yamada K, Marasinghe A.: "Color Interaction, Psychological Functioning and Kansei Measurement Method" 2009 Journal of Medical Informatics and Technologies . 223-228 (2009)
 Amaratunga T., Cho Y.I., Jayatilleke A.U., Maso Ichikawa M., Nakahara S., Marasinghe A.: "Hospital Based Injury Surveillance System for Low and Middle Income Countries." 2009 Journal of Medical Informatics and Technologies Journal . 101-106 (2009)
 Fernando S., Matsuzaki S., Nakamura Y., and Marasinghe A., Agent based approach for homeostatic plasticity in neuronal activities, The Journal of Artificial Life and Robotics, vol.14, 2009
 Matsuzaki S., Fernando S., Marasinghe A., Artificial life system for autonomous neural activity based on homeostatic plasticity, The Journal of Three Dimensional Images, Vol. 23 No.2, 2009 July, pp 71–76.
 Matsuzaki S., Fernando S., Marasinghe A., Autonomous evolutionary system with internally generated interactions simulated using an artificial life system, The Journal of Three Dimensional Images, Vol. 23 No.2, 2009 July, pp 77–82.
 Marasinghe A., Fernando S., Matsuzaki S., Nakamura Y., Simulation of Homeostasis Plasticity as Molecular Reaction, The Journal of Three Dimensional Images, vol 23 No 1, 2009 March, pp 64–69.
 Nakahara S, Jayatilleke AU, Ichikawa M, Marasinghe A, Kimura A, Yoshida K (2008).　Feasibility of standardized injury surveillance and reporting: a comparison of data from four Asian nations. Injury Prevention (BMJ group) 2008; 14:106-112.
 Rajapakse R. P. C. J., Miyata K., Nagai Y., and Marasinghe C. A. (2008) Perceived Visual Roughness: Empirical Study on Effect of Shape, The Journal of Three Dimensional Images, vol.22, no.2, pp. 59–64.
 Tharangie　D., Marasinghe　 C. A. (2008). Design an Interactive Visual Environment for a Public Place, The Journal of Three Dimensional Images, Vol.22 No.2 2008 – 6,  pp 43–48
 Rajapakse R. P. C. J., Miyata K., and Marasinghe C. A. (2007) “3D Texture Node for Generating Camouflage Textures in Maya,” The Journal of Three Dimensional Images, vol.21, no.2, pp. 130–135
 Jayatilleke A. U., Marasinghe C. A., and Jayatilleke A. C. (2007) A computer based system for traffic injury surveillance in Sri Lanka. Annual Research Journal of Sri Lanka Students' Association in Japan 2007; 7:45-50.
 Balasuriya, J.C., Marasinghe, C.A., Watanabe, K., Izumi, K., and Osano, M. (2006). Tracking and Path Planning in Real Time Dynamic Environment for Ubiquitous Robots Using Single Binocular Vision System. Journal of 3D Forum, 20 (1), 48-53
 Karunanayka, M.L.M., Marasinghe, C. A., Kodikara, N.D. (2006). Segmentation of Unconstrained Cursive Sinhala Words. Journal of 3D Forum, 20 (1), 55-59
 De Silva, P. R., Osano, M. Marasinghe, A. & Madurapperuma, A. P. (2006). Towards Emotion Recognized with Intensity from Affective Body Gesture in Interactive System. Special issue on Humanoids, International Journal of Humanoid Robotics (IJHR) 269-274
 De Silva, P. R., Osano, M. Marasinghe, A. & Madurapperuma, A. P. (2006). A Computational Model for Recognizing Emotion with Intensity for Machine Vision applications. Special issue on Machine vision application, Journal of The Institute of Electronic, Information and Communication Engineers (IEICE), Volume E89-D, Number 7 pp. 2171–2179
 Lambacher, S., Martens, W. Kakehi, K. Marasinghe, C. & Molholt,G. (2005). The Effects of Identification Training on the Identification and Production of American English Vowels by Native Speakers of Japanese. Applied Psycholinguistics, 26 (2), 227-247.
 Marasinghe, C., Lambacher, S, Cohen, M., Osano. M. (2004). Interpretation of Kansei Properties in Perceptual Space. Journal of 3D Forum, 18 (4), 86-90.
 Marasinghe, C., Martens, W., Lambacher, S, Cohen, M., Herath, S. & Madurapperuma, A.P. (2004). Relating to a Common Perceptual Space for American English Vowels to Multilingual Verbal Attributes. Journal of 3D Forum, 18 (1), 144-149.
 Giragama, C. N. W., Martens, W. L., Wanasinghe, D. R., Cohen M., and Marasinghe C. A. (2004). Language Universals: CrosPus-Lingual Comparison of Topic Dependent Adjectives, Journal of Universal Languages, 5:1
 Marasinghe, C., Lambacher, S, Martens, W., Cohen, M., Giragama, C., Herath, S. & Molholt, G. (2003). Universal Perceptual Attributes for Perception of American English Vowels by English and Japanese Native Speakers and Implications for Language Typology. Journal of Universal Language, 4:1, 117-145.

Publications - Book Chapters 

 Tharangie K. G. D, Matsuzaki S., Marasinghe A., Yamada K. Insight into Kansei Color Combinations in Interactive User Interface Designing. HCI (1) 2009: 735–744, Julie A. Jacko (Ed.): Human-Computer Interaction. New Trends, 13th International Conference, HCI International 2009, San Diego, CA, USA, July 19–24, 2009, Proceedings, Part I. Lecture Notes in Computer Science 5610 Springer 2009, 
 Balasuriya J. C., Marasinghe C. A., Watanabe K Adaptive Personal Space for Humanizing Mobile Robots 1-20, Nilanjan Sarkar (Ed.): Human-Robot Interaction. I-Tech Education and Publishing, September 2007, 
 Balasuriya J. C., Marasinghe C. A., Watanabe K., and Osano M. (2007): Kansei Analysis for Robotic Motions in Ubiquitous Environments. In: Smith, Michael J. and Salvendy, Gavriel (eds.)  HCI 07, Symposium on Human Interface 2007 - Part I, Beijing, China July, pp. 804–813, 2007

Publications - Refereed Conference Articles 

 UAP Ishanka, A Marasinghe (2015), Supporting user interaction of social network mobile application with multimodal interaction, 10th Asia-Pacific Symposium on Information and Telecommunication
 AD. Dharmawansa, A Marasinghe, Y Fukumura, RPCJ Rajapakse and RAM Madhuwanthi (2015) “A Novel Approach to Attain the Feedback of the Students in the Virtual Learning”, ASIAGRAPH 2015 International Conference, Vol. 10, No. 1, pp. 47–52,
 Prabath Weerasinghe, R. P. C. Janaka, Rajapakse, Ashu Marasinghe (2015) Data Acquisition for Empirical Analysis on Emotional Body Gesture, International Conferences Asiagraph
 RAM Madhuwanthi, A Marasignhe, RPCJ Rajapakse and AD Dharmawansa (2015) “A Recommendation Mechanism for the Adaptation of the Activity Based Travel Demand Model”, International Symposium on Affective Science and Engineering, Vol 1, 
 C P Liyanage, A Marasinghe, S Wijesinghe (2015), Applicability of AI for Water Quality Monitoring Network Design; a Case of Kelani River, Sri Lanka,presented at the Eleventh Annual Session, Artifical Intelligence, The Open University of Technology.
 C P Liyanage, A Marasinghe, B Liyanage (2015) Assess the Applicability of Remote Sensing Mapping to Monitor the Water Quality in Kelani River in Sri Lanka, The 4th International GIGAKU Conference in Nagaoka(IGCN2015)
 C P Liyanage, A Marasinghe, T W A Wijesinghe (2015) Effective ICT based water quality data visualization for the Kelani River in Sri Lanka, Asiagraph 2015 conference, Tainan National University of the Arts, Guant , Taiwan 24 April 2015
 C P Liyanage, A. Marasinghe (2015) Optimized Selection of Sampling Sites Network for Water Quality Monitoring of River in Sri Lanka”, in International Society of Affective Science and Engineering (ISASE), Kogakuin Univertsity, Shinjuku, Tokyo, Japan. 22, 23 March 2015.
 C P Liyanage, A Marasinghe, T W A Wijesinghe (2015) Applicability of AI for Water Quality Monitoring Network Design; a Case of Kelani River,Sri Lanka”, in SLAAI International Conference 2014 Colombo, Sri Lanka, 20 March 2015
 C P Liyanage, A Marasinghe (2015) ICT Based Water Quality Monitoring System of Kelani River in Sri Lanka, First Symposium of Japan Sri Lanka Technology Promotion Association (JSTPA), Open University of Sri Lanka, Nawal, Sri Lanka. 16 March 2015
 C P Liyanage, A Marasinghe (2014) Appropriate Components of ICT Based Water Management System for Sri Lanka” in Proc. International Conference on Social Science (ICOSS 2014), Hotel Galadari Colombo, Sri Lanka, organized by The International Institute of Knowledge Management (TIIKM) 25 March 2014
 AD. Dharmawansa, K Nakahira, Y Fukumura and A Marasinghe(2014), “Introducing and Identifying the Role of Eye Blinking in the Virtual e-Learning Environment”, Transactions on GIGAKU, Vol. 2, No. 2, pp. S01002/1-7
 P Kalansooriya, A Marasinghe (2014), Developing an Innovative Digital Learning Platform in Enhancing the Online Presence of Technological Universities, The 3rd International GIGAKU Conference in Nagaoka (IGCN 2014) 1 (1), 85
 S Lekamge, A Marasinghe (2014), Identifying the associations between music and emotion in developing an emotion based music recommendation system, The 3rd International GIGAKU Conference in Nagaoka (IGCN 2014)
 S Lekamge, A Marasinghe, P Kalansooriya (2014), PCA based visualization of digital music libraries in assisting emotion based music navigation, The 3rd International GIGAKU Conference in Nagaoka (IGCN 2014)
 C P Liyanage, A Marasinghe (2013) Requirements analysis for appropriate ICT based water management system for Sri Lanka," in Proc. the 1st Int. Conf. on Energy, Environment and Human Engineering, Yangon, Myanmar, 21-23 Dec. 2013, pg. 131
 Prabath Weerasinghe, Ashu Marasinghe, Rasika Ranaweera, Senaka Amarakeerthi, Michael Cohen, (2013) Emotion Expression For Affective Social Communication, in Proc. 2013 International Conference on Biometrics and Kansei Engineering, Tokyo, Japan, 5-7, pp. 148-153
 C P Liyanage, A Marasinghe (2013) Planning smart meal in a Smart City for a smart living, in Proc. 2013 Int. Conf. on Biometrics and Kansei Engineering, Tokyo, Japan, 5–7 July 2013, pp. 166-171, © 2013 IEEE. doi: 10.1109/ICBAKE.2013.33 9.
 S Lekamge, A Marasinghe (2013), Developing a Smart City model that ensures the optimum utilization of existing resources in cities of all sizes, International Conference on Biometrics and Kansei Engineering - ICBAKE
 AD Dharmawansa K Nakahira Y Fukumura and A Marasinghe (2013) “Introducing and Identifying the Role of Eye Blinking in the Virtual eLearning Environment”, International Conference on Energy, Environment and Human Engineering, pp. 144
 Fernando S., Koichi Yamada K., Marasinghe A. (2010) Neuroscience inspired architecture for neural computing. 13th International Conference on Humans and Computers HC-2010, December 2010, Aizu-Wakamatsu, Japan Rajapakse R. P. C. J., Tokuyama Y., Marasinghe A. Miyata K., and Somadeva R. (2010) Visualization and Haptic Rendering of Ancient Woodcarvings in Sri Lanka. 14th International Conference on Geometry and Graphics, August 5–9, 2010, Kyoto, International Society for Geometry and Graphics
 AD Dharmawansa, RPCJ Rajapakse and A Marasinghe (2009) “Impact of the Technology Revolution in Rural Sri Lanka Areas Implementing a Banking System”, International Conference on Humans and Computers, pp. 106–111
 Marasinghe A., Tharangie K. G. D, and Yamada K. (2009). Conceptual Models for Kansei Color Intercation, International Conference on Humanoid Systems (2009), Seoul, Korea, November 2009
 Marasinghe A. (2009) Public Health Informatics: priorities, challenges, and opportunities, XIV International Conference on Medical Informatics and Technologies (MIT 2009), Szczawnica, Poland, October, 2009
 Fernando S., Cho Y. I., Nakamura Y., Matsuzaki S., and Marasinghe A. (2009), Modeling learning on Dynamic behavior of Synapses, XIV International Conference on Medical Informatics and Technologies (MIT 2009), Szczawnica, Poland, October, 2009
 Tharangie K G D, Irfan C. M. A., Cho Y. M., Nomura S., Yamada K, and Marasinghe A. (2009) Color Interaction, Psychological Functioning and Kansei Measurement Method, XIV International Conference on Medical Informatics and Technologies (MIT 2009), Szczawnica, Poland, October, 2009
 Amaratunga T., Cho Y. I., Jayatilleke A. U., Maso Ichikawa M., Nakahara S., and Marasinghe A. (2009) Hospital Based Injury Surveillance System for Low and Middle Income Countries XIV International Conference on Medical Informatics and Technologies (MIT 2009), Szczawnica, Poland, October, 2009
 Fernando S., Nakamura Y., Matsuzaki S., and Marasinghe A. Synaptic Plasticity as Agent Communication, in the Proceedings of the IEEE International Multi-Conference on Biometrics and Kansei Engineering, Cieszyn, Poland, June 2009
 Matsuzaki S., Fernando S., and Marasinghe A., Decision Making Model Supporting Emergency Medical Care, in the Proceedings of the IEEE International Multi-Conference on Biometrics and Kansei Engineering, Cieszyn, Poland, June 2009
 Tharangie K. G. D., Marasinghe C. A., and Yamada K. (2009) When Children sense in colours: Determinants of Colour - Emotion Mapping IEEE International Multi-Conference on Biometrics and Kansei Engineering, Cieszyn, Poland, June 2009
 Fernando S., Matsuzaki S., Nakamura Y., and Marasinghe A, Agent based approach for homeostatic plasticity in neuronal activities, in Proceedings of the International Conference on Artificial Life and Robotics, Beppu, Japan, February, 2009
 Tharangie K. G. D., Marasinghe C. A., and K. Yamada. (2008) Kansei Assessing System to Enhance Aesthetic Significance of an Interactive Learning Environment,  2nd Inter. Conf. on Kansei Engineering and Affective Systems, Nagaoka, Japan. pp. 151–152. Nov, 2008
 Fernando S., Matsuzaki S., Nakamura Y., and Marasinghe A., Simulation of Neuronal Activity using Molecular Reaction, in Proceedings of the 11th International Conference on Humans and Computers, Nagaoka, Japan. pp.   Nov, 2008
 Hakizabera A. U., Senoutomo A. A., Saracanlao N., Sukmawati S., Mikami Y., and Marasinghe C. A. (2008) Country Domain Governance Information Portal (CDGIP). International Symposium on Country Domain Governance (CDG`08) Nagaoka, Japan. pp.   Nov, 2008
 Fernando S., Karunananda A., Matsuzaki S., and Marasinghe A., Ontological Modeling in Kansei Engineering, in Proceedings of the 2nd International Conference on Kansei Engineering & Effective Systems, Nagaoka, Japan. pp.   Nov, 2008.
 Rajapakse R. P. C. J., Miyata K., Marasinghe C. A., and Tokuyama Y. (2008) A Shading Model for Color-shift Effect of Metallic Materials, Proceedings of the 11th International Conference on Humans and Computers (HC'2008), Nagaoka, Japan, Nov, 2008.
 Saracanlao N. and Marasinghe C. A. (2008) Multi-agent based Social Network Relation Grid for Migrant Workers, Proceedings of the 11th International Conference on Humans and Computers (HC'2008), Nagaoka, Japan, Nov, 2008.
 Rajapakse R. P. C. J., Miyata K., Marasinghe C. A., and Tokuyama Y. (2008) Proposal on Kansei based Material Editing, The Second International Conference on Kansei Engineering & Affective Systems (KEAS '08), Nagaoka, Japan, Nov, 2008.
 Tharangie K. G. D., Marasinghe C. A., and K. Yamada. (2008) Kansei Colour Aesthetics in an Interactive Learning Environment, Proc.7th European. Conf. on e-Learning (ECEL), Agia Napa, Cyprus, pp. 15– 23. Nov 2008
 Tharangie K. G. D., Irfan C. M. A., Marasinghe C. A., and K. Yamada. (2008) Kansei Engineering Assessing System to enhance the usability in E- learning web Interfaces: Colour basis, Workshop Proc. 16th Inter. Conf. on Computers in Education(ICCE), Workshop on Testing and Assessment, Taipe, Taiwan pp. 145–150 (Oct.  2008)
 Tharangie K. G. D., Kumara K. G. K., Jayasinghe I., Marasinghe C. A., and K. Yamada. (2008) Kansei Color Associations for an Interactive Learning Environment for Children, Proc. IEEE/SCIS & ISIS 2008, Nagoya, Japan. pp. 57–61. Sep. 2008
 Noel S. Saracanlao N. S. and Marasinghe A. (2008) Multi-agent Based Social Security System for Migrant Workers, IEEE/SCIS & ISIS 2008, Nagoya, Japan, pp.  Sep. 2008
 Rajapakse R. P. C. J., Miyata K., Nagai Y., and Marasinghe C. A. (2007) Perceived visual roughness: Effect of shape characteristics, Proceedings of the 10th International Conference on Humans and Computers (HC'2007), pp. 95–100, Dusseldorf, Germany. Dec 2007,
 Jayatilleke A. U., Marasinghe C. A., Nakahara S., Lambacher S., Nandasara S. T., Jayatilleke A. C. A global prototype for traffic injury surveillance system. In: Proceedings of the IEEE special topic conference on information technology applications in biomedicine 2007, Tokyo, Japan, Nov, 2007.
 Jayatilleke A. U., Marasinghe C. A., Nandasara S. T., Jayatilleke AC, Jimba M. Web based surveillance system for road traffic injuries. In: Proceedings of the IEEE seventh international conference on computer and information technology, Aizu-Wakamatsu, Japan, Oct, 2007.
 Balasuriya J. C., Marasinghe C. A., and Watanabe K., ANFIS for Adaptive Personal Space Determination for Ubiquitous Robots. In: Proceedings of the IEEE seventh international conference on computer and information technology, Aizu-Wakamatsu, Japan, pp. 973–978, Oct, 2007.
 Rajapakse R. P. C. J., Miyata K., Nagai Y., and Marasinghe C. A. (2007) The Effect of shape on the Perception of Visual Roughness,” Proceedings of the Third International Symposium on Humanized Systems (ISHS'07), Muroran, Hokkaido, Japan. pp. 119–122, Sep, 2007
 De Silva, P. R., Marasinghe, C.A., Madurapperuma, A. P. & Osano, M. (2006).  Modeling Cognitive Structure of Emotion for Developing a Pedagogical Agent Based Interactive Game. IEEE International Conference on Systems, Man, and Cybernetics (SMC 2006), Taipei, Taiwan. , pp. 339 – 344. Oct. 2006
 Rajapakse R. P. C. J., Miyata K., and Marasinghe C. A. (2006) Camouflage-Shader: A Shading Node for Generating Camouflage Materials in Maya, Proceedings of the Ninth International Conference on Humans and Computers (HC'2006), Aizu-Wakamatsu, Japan, pp. 31–35 Sep, 2006
 Giragama, C., Marasinghe, C.A., Madurapperuma, A. P. Wanasinghe, D. R., Herath, S. & Osano, M. (2006). Cross—Language Similarity between Perceptual and Semantic Structures of Color Tones. IEEE International Conference on Systems, Man, and Cybernetics (SMC 2006), Taipei, Taiwan. , 345-352. Oct. 2006
 Wanasinghe, D. R., Marasinghe, C.A., Madurapperuma, A. P. Giragama, C., Herath, S. & Osano, M. (2006). Boundary Color Tones between Color Modifiers in Two Languages. IEEE International Conference on Systems, Man, and Cybernetics (SMC 2006), Taipei, Taiwan. , pp 332–338. Oct. 2006
 Rajapakse R. P. C. J., Miyata K., Nagai Y., Marasinghe C. A., and Madurapperuma A. P. (2006) How Creative Design Space in Digital Painting, Proceedings of the First International Conference on Kansei Engineering and Intelligent Systems (KEIS '06), Aizu-Wakamatsu, Japan. pp. 182–187, Sep, 2006
 De Silva, P. R., Osano, M. Marasinghe, A. & Madurapperuma, A. P. (2006). A Multi-Agent Based Interactive System Towards Children’s Emotion Performances Quantified Through Affective Body Gestures, IEEE/18th International Conference on Pattern Recognition (ICPR'06) Volume 1, icpr, vol. 1, pp. 1236–1239, Aug, 2006
 De Silva, P. R., Madurapperuma, A. P.  Marasinghe, A. & Osano, M. (2006). Integrating animated pedagogical agent as motivational supporter into interactive system. IEEE/Third Canadian Conference on Computer and Robot Vision (CRV'06), pp 34–40, June, 2006
 De Silva, P. R., Osano, M. Marasinghe, A. & Madurapperuma, A. P. (2006). Towards recognizing emotion with the affective dimensions through body gestures. IEEE/7th International Conference Automatic Face and Gesture Recognition, FG2006 Southampton, UK, pp 269–274, April 2006
 Balasuriya, J.C., Marasinghe, C.A., Watanabe, K., Izumi (2006). Kansei and Human Experience Analysis for Mobile Robot Navigation in Ubiquitous Environment. 11th International Symposium in Artificial Life and Robotics 2006 (AROB 06), Oita, Japan, January 2006
 Balasuriya, J.C., Marasinghe, C.A., Watanabe, K., Izumi, K. (2005). Accessibility for the Blind in Ubiquitous Environments Using Binocular Vision System 7th International Information Technology Conference (IITC) 2005, Colombo, Sri Lanka. November 9–10, 2005.
 Balasuriya, J.C., Marasinghe, C.A., Watanabe, K., Izumi, K., Osano, M. (2005). Adaptive Neural Fuzzy Inference System (ANFIS) for Tracking and Path Planning in Real Time Dynamic Environment for Ubiquitous Robots Using Single Binocular Vision System. HC-2005 - Eighth International Conference on Humans and Computers, Aizu-Wakamatsu, Japan.
 Karunanayka, M.L.M., Marasinghe, C. A., Kodikara, N.D. (2005). Segmentation of Handwritten Sinhala Words in to Isolated Characters. HC-2005 - Eighth International Conference on Humans and Computers, Aizu-Wakamatsu, Japan.
 Marasinghe, C. A., Osano M., Madurapperuama A. P. (2005). Kansei Speech Analysis in Sinhalese Perception. The 6th Japan-Korea International Symposium on Kansei Engineering, Tokyo, Japan.
 Lambacher, S., Martens, W. Kakehi, K. Marasinghe, C. & Molholt,G. (2005). An SDT-based Analysis of AE Vowel Identification and Production Performance by Native Speakers of Japanese. Paper presented at the 149th Meeting of the Acoustical Society of America, Vancouver, Canada.
 Karunanayaka, M. L; Marasinghe, C. A; Kodikara, N. D; (2005). Thresholding, Noise Reduction and Skew correction of Sinhala Handwritten Words. IAPR Conference on Machine Vision Applications, MVA 2005, Tsukuba, Japan.
 Marasinghe, C. A., Lambacher, S., Martens, W. L., Cohen, M., Giragama, C., Herath, S. & Molholt, G. (2004). Structural Representation of Perceptual Similarity and Multilingual Verbal Attributes; Deriving a Common Perceptual Space for Perception of American English Vowels by English and Japanese Native Speakers. Proceedings of the 18th International Congress on Acoustics, Kyoto, Japan.
 Giragama, C., Martens, W., Wanasinghe, D., Cohen, M., Lambacher, S. & Marasinghe, C. (2004). Cross-lingual Relation of Languages: Using Procrustes Transformation of Perceptual Space and Factor Space of Guitar Timbres. Proceedings of the International Symposium on Musical Acoustics (ISMA2004), Nara, Japan.
 Marasinghe, C. A., Lambacher, S., Martens, W. L., Cohen, M., Herath, S., Molholt, G., & Madurapperuma, A. P. (2004). Semantic Characteristics for Perception of American English Vowels by English, Japanese, and Sinhala Native Speakers. Proceedings of the First International Workshop on Emergence and Evolution of Linguistic Communication. May 31- June 1, Kanazawa, Japan.
 Marasinghe, C. A., Lambacher, S., Martens, W. L., Madurapperuama, A. P., Cohen, M., Herath, S. (2003). KANSEI Information Processing for Perception of Vowel Sounds. 5th International Information Technology Conference (IITC) 2003, Colombo, Sri Lanka. December 3–4, 2003.
 Marasinghe, C. A., Martens, W. L., Herath, S. & Madurapperuma, A. P. (2003). Relating to a Common Perceptual Space for American English Vowels to Multilingual Verbal Attributes. HC-2003 - Sixth International Conference on Humans and Computers, Aizu-Wakamatsu, Japan. August 28–30.
 Marasinghe, C. A., Herath, S., Herath, A. (2002). Word-Sense Disambiguation of Sinhala Language with Unsupervised Learning, International conference on information technology and applications, (ICITA- 2002), Bathurst, Australia, 25-29, November 2002.
 Marasinghe, C. A., Herath, S., (2001). Corpus-Based Statistical Approach to Word-Sense Disambiguation in Sinhala. 20th National Information Technology Conference, Colombo, Sri Lanka, 3–5 July 2001.
 Martens, W. L.,  Marasinghe, C. A., Giragama, C. N. W., Madurapperuma, A. P. (2000). Topic-dependent adjective use in Japanese and Sinhala: Selection of adjectives differentiating guitar sounds. Seventh Int. Workshop on Human Interface Technology, Aizu-Wakamatsu, Japan.

References

External links 
 

1971 births
Living people
Sri Lankan politicians
Sri Lankan academics
Sinhalese academics
Sinhalese educators
United National Party politicians
Members of the 15th Parliament of Sri Lanka
Alumni of the University of Colombo